Shilton and Barnacle is a civil parish in the Borough of Rugby in Warwickshire, England. It consists of the village of Shilton, and the nearby hamlet of Barnacle. In the 2001 census it had a population of 826, increasing to 875 at the 2011 Census. The civil parish was renamed from Shilton to Shilton and Barnacle on 1 December 2012.

References

External links 
 Shilton & Barnacle Parish Council

Civil parishes in Warwickshire
Borough of Rugby